{{Infobox school 
| name         = Kelly College
| logo         = File:KellyArms.png
| logo_size    = 120px
| logo_alt     = Arms of Kelly of Kelly, Devon
| image        = Kelly_College_Landscape.jpg
| image_size         = 220px
| motto        = Fortiter Occupa Portum("Defend your harbours bravely")
| established  = 1877
| closed       = 2014
| type         = Public schoolIndependent schoolDay and boarding schoolCo-educational
| religious_affiliation     = Church of England
| president    = 
| head_label   = Head Master
| head         = Graham Hawley 
| r_head_label = 
| r_head       = 
| chair_label  = Chairman of the Governors
| chair        = Rear Admiral Christopher Snow 
| founder      = Admiral Benedictus Marwood Kelly
| specialist   = 
| city         = Tavistock
| local_authority          = 
| Ofsted       = 
| dfeno        = 878/6009
| staff        = c.66
| enrolment   = 310
| gender       = Co-educational
| lower_age    = 3
| upper_age    = 18
| houses       = School (Girls YR9-11) 
Marwood (Girls Sixth Form Boarders) 
Russell (Girls Day Sixth Form) 
Courtenay (Boys Sixth Form) 
Newton (Boys YR9-11) 
Conway (Mixed) 1st & 2nd years only
| colours      = Navy & white  
| publication  = Kelly College Chronicle (Annual)
| free_label_1 = Former pupils
| free_1       = Old Kelleians
| free_label_2 = Ofsted
| free_2       = Good
| free_label_3 = Virtual Houses
| free_3       =*Tamar 
Plym 
Lyd 
Walkham 
}}

Kelly College was a coeducational independent school in the English public school tradition situated in the outskirts of Tavistock, Devon, with around 350 students ranging from ages 3 to 18. There was an associated preparatory school for primary school children, Kelly College Preparatory School, nearby. In June 2014, the school formally merged with Mount House School to form Mount Kelly School.

The college had twenty acres (eight hectares) of landscaped grounds, including playing fields, set on the edge of Dartmoor and including a stretch of the River Tavy, and four separate senior boarding houses, and a junior house, each with its own facilities.

The last headship was of Mr Mark Semmence who joined the college in 2013. The college's motto is fortiter occupa portum - "defend your harbours bravely", a quotation from Ode XIV from the first Book of Odes by Horace.(1)

It offered many extracurricular activities, such as the CCF (Combined Cadet Force) and the DofE Scheme; in addition to a wide variety of sporting activities.

 History 
The school was founded in 1877 after Admiral Benedictus Marwood Kelly left the great part of his real and personal estate to Trustees, founding a charity which he directed should be called "The Kelly College", which should be for the education of the "sons of Naval officers and other gentlemen". The school opened in October 1877, under the Headmastership of Robert West Taylor, late fellow of St John's College, Cambridge, with twelve boys on the school roll. It became co-educational in the early 1970s, initially with entrants into the Sixth Form, and in September 1991 welcomed thirty one girls into the First Form, fourteen of whom became Kelly Veterans in 1998.

Houses
The School had six houses;

School house (Girls Year 9-11 boarding/day House) (founded 1877), Courtenay House (Senior Boys House boarding /day) (founded 1901), Newton House (Boys Year 9-11 boarding/day house) (founded 1939), Conway House (Junior house, 1st and 2nd form only)  (founded 1975), and Marwood House (Senior Girls House) (founded 1983),

Notable attendees"Old Kelleians"Adedayo Adebayo, rugby player
Dawn Airey, Chief executive officer (CEO) of Getty Images, chairman of National Youth Theatre; managing director of global content ITV; SVP EMEA of Yahoo; president CLT Ufa; chairman and CEO of Channel 5.
 Robin Brew, British Olympic Swimmer
Claire Cashmore MBE, swimmer
Sharron Davies MBE, swimmer
Flora Duffy, Bermudian triathlete
Femi Fani-Kayode, Nigerian politician
George Hacker, Bishop of Penrith
Andy Jameson, BBC Sports commentator & former Olympic swimmer
 Ellen Keane, swimmer
John Lucas, Archdeacon of Totnes
Rod Mason, Trad Jazz Vocalist, trumpet and cornet player
Malcolm Stewart Hannibal McArthur, first British resident in Brunei
Sir Gordon Minhinnick KCMG CVO, cartoonist
 Hannah Russell MBE, swimmer
 Michael Jones MBE, swimmer 
Gerald Seymour, novelist and former ITN correspondent 
 Lauren Steadman, triathlete
Bishop Mervyn Stockwood, Bishop of Southwark
Thomas Douglas Victor Swinscow, deputy editor British Medical Journal (1964 - 1977) and founder of British Lichen Society and The Lichenologist''.
Charles Symons CB MC, Chaplain-General to the Forces
Sir Hugh Thornton KCMG CVO, civil servant
Air Marshall Sir Richard Gordon Wakeford KCB, LVO, OBE, AFC, RAF officer
Jakie Wellman, Zambian Olympic Swimmer
Mike Westbrook OBE, jazz musician

References

Defunct schools in Devon
Educational institutions established in 1877
Educational institutions disestablished in 2014
Boarding schools in Devon
Tavistock
Defunct boarding schools in England
1877 establishments in England